Chinese steamed eggs or water egg is a traditional Chinese dish found all over China. Eggs are beaten to a consistency similar to that used for an omelette and then steamed. It is sometimes referred to as egg custard on menus.  If eaten cold, it has a taste and texture of a gelatin without sugar (unless added).

Preparation
The eggs are beaten and water added to create a more tender texture. A good ratio of water to eggs is 1.5:1. Sesame oil, soy sauce, or chicken broth may be used to add additional flavor. 

Other solid ingredients (such as mushrooms, clams, or crab meat) may also be added to the mixture. The egg mixture is poured into a dish, which is then placed in a steamer and steamed until fully cooked.  The eggs should be steamed until just firm, so that the texture of the eggs is still smooth and silky.  A plate is usually placed on top of the bowl containing the egg mixture and left on while the egg is being steamed.  Uncapped steamed eggs will have water on top of the finished dish due to the steam.

Using four eggs, the average cooking time is 10 minutes with water, 7 minutes with chicken broth. However, this is in addition to the time needed for pre-boiling water.

Other cooking methods
This same dish can be cooked in a microwave, or in a pressure cooker. Both methods take less time, although the end product may not be of the same quality.

Variations
Homemade versions might include scallion, century egg, or dried shrimp. These additional ingredients are added to the egg mixture before steaming. It can also be enjoyed with soy sauce. The taste is usually savory (as opposed to a sweet custard).

See also
 Chawanmushi – A Japanese egg custard dish
 Gyeran jjim – Korean steamed eggs
 List of egg dishes
 List of steamed foods

References

External links

 Chinese Steamed Egg. Chinasichuanfood.com.

Cantonese cuisine
Egg dishes
Steamed foods